The 1946 Iowa State Cyclones football team represented Iowa State College of Agricultural and Mechanic Arts (later renamed Iowa State University) in the Big Six Conference during the 1946 college football season. In their fifth and final year under head coach Mike Michalske, the Cyclones compiled a 2–6–1 record (1–4 against conference opponents), finished in fifth place in the conference, and were outscored by opponents by a combined total of 239 to 77. They played their home games at Clyde Williams Field in Ames, Iowa.

Two Iowa State players received honors from the Associated Press (AP) or United Press (UP) on the 1946 All-Big Six Conference football team: end Dean Laun (UP-2); and back Dick Howard (UP-3).

There was no team captain selected for the 1946 season. The regular starting lineup consisted of ends Dean Laun and Bob Jensen, tackles Lou Bosnyak and Harle Rollinger, guards Fred Schneider and Norman Anderson, center James Riding, quarterback Don Ferguson, halfbacks Webb Halbert and Vic Weber, and fullback Ray Klootwyk.

Schedule

After the season

The 1947 NFL Draft was held on December 16, 1946. The following Cyclone was selected.

References

Iowa State
Iowa State Cyclones football seasons
Iowa State Cyclones football